The 1990 Asian Taekwondo Championships were the 9th edition of the Asian Taekwondo Championships, and were held in Taipei from 2 to 4 June, 1990.

Medal summary

Men

Women

Medal table

Team ranking

Men

Women

See also
 List of sporting events in Taiwan

References

Results

External links
Results

Asian Championships
Asian Taekwondo Championships
Asian Taekwondo Championships
Taekwondo Championships